The , also known as the Ministry of War, was the cabinet-level ministry in the Empire of Japan charged with the administrative affairs of the Imperial Japanese Army (IJA). It existed from 1872 to 1945.

History

Initially, the Army Ministry was in charge of both administration and operational command of the Imperial Japanese Army. However, with the creation of the Imperial Japanese Army General Staff Office in December 1878, it was left with only administrative functions. Its primary role was to secure the army budget, weapons procurement, personnel, relations with the National Diet and the Cabinet and broad matters of military policy.

The post of Army Minister was politically powerful. Although a member of the Cabinet after the establishment of the cabinet system of government in 1885, the Army Minister was answerable directly to the Emperor (the commander-in-chief of all Japanese armed forces under the Meiji Constitution) and not the Prime Minister.

From the time of its creation, the post of Army Minister was usually filled by an active-duty general in the Imperial Japanese Army. Abolished in 1913 under the administration of Yamamoto Gonnohyōe, the law was revived again in 1936 at the insistence of the Army General Staff by Prime Minister Hirota Kōki. At the same time, the Imperial Japanese Army prohibited its generals from accepting political offices except by permission from Imperial General Headquarters. Taken together, these arrangements gave the Imperial Japanese Army an effective, legal right to nominate (or refuse to nominate) the Army Minister. The ability of the Imperial Japanese Army to refuse to nominate an Army Minister gave it effective veto power over the formation (or continuation) of any civilian administration, and was a key factor in the erosion of representative democracy and the rise of Japanese militarism.

After 1937, both the Army Minister and the Chief of the Army General Staff were members of the Imperial General Headquarters.

With the surrender of the Empire of Japan in World War II, the Army Ministry was abolished together with the Imperial Japanese Army by the Allied occupation authorities in November 1945 and was not revived in the post-war Constitution of Japan.

Organization
 Under-Secretary of the Army (Vice Minister)
 Military Affairs Bureau
 Personnel Bureau
 Weapons Bureau
 Army Service Bureau
 Administration Bureau
 Intendance (Accounts and Supply)
 Medical
 Judicial Bureau
 Economic Mobilization Bureau
 Aeronautical Department
 Economic Mobilization (abolished in April 1945)

The Army Ministry and Imperial General Headquarters were located in Ichigaya Heights, which is now part of Shinjuku, Tokyo.

Ministers of the Army of Japan

See also
 Imperial Japanese Army General Staff Office

References
 
 
 "Foreign Office Files for Japan and the Far East". Adam Matthew Publications. Retrieved 2 March 2005.

Imperial Japanese Army
War
Politics of the Empire of Japan
1872 establishments in Japan
1945 disestablishments in Japan